This is a list of shopping malls under the SM Supermalls chain managed by the Philippine firm SM Prime. Most malls are in the Philippines, while some are in China.

List

Philippines

Existing malls
The following is a list of SM shopping malls in the Philippines. Gross floor area is based on the latest press release of SM Prime Holdings, and on SM Supermall Mall Profile literature.

SMDC Malls

The following malls and strip malls, called SMDC The Strips, are located at SMDC Residences or Condominiums. The format of each strip mall's official name is SMDC Strip followed by the name of the SMDC Residence where it is located.

SMDC Malls

SMDC The Strip Malls

Other malls/outlets

Future malls
These are SM Malls which are either under construction or proposed. Those in bold italics are included in SM Prime's latest investor kit presentation and offer supplement.
{| class="wikitable sortable" style="font-size:90%;"
|-
! # !! Name !! Opening Date!! Land area (m2)!! Floor area (m2) !! Status !! class="unsortable" |Location
|-
| 1||SM City Santo Tomas|| September 2023|| TBA || 58,000|| Under construction || Santo Tomas, Batangas
|-

| 2||SM Center San Pedro|| 2023 || 35,000 || 23,000 || Under construction ||  San Pedro, Laguna
|-
| 3 ||SM City Deparo || 2024 ||38,450|| 70,681 || Under construction || Deparo Road, Bagumbong, Caloocan City
|-
| 4||SM City Zamboanga|| 2024|| TBA|| 60,000|| Under Construction || Zamboanga City
|-
| 5||SM City Laoag|| TBD || 102,293|| 61,256|| Planned || Airport Avenue, Brgy. 51-B Nangalisan West, Laoag, Ilocos Norte
|-
| 6||SM City San Fernando La Union|| 2024|| TBA || 58,864|| Under Construction|| San Fernando, La Union
|-
| 7 || SM Harrison by SMDC' || 2025 || TBA || TBA || Under Construction || Adriatico St. F.B Harrison St. Malate Manila
|-

| 8|| J Centre Mall Redevelopment|| March 2024 || TBA || TBA || Acquired || A. S. Fortuna St., Mandaue City, Cebu
|-
| 9||SM City Tagum|| TBD || 36,965 || 51,935|| Planned || Magugpo, Tagum
|-
| 10||SM City Malolos|| TBD || 137,812|| 79,923|| Fenced || Veritas Property, Brgy. Dakila, Malolos, Bulacan
|-
| 11||SM City Commonwealth|| TBD || TBA || TBA|| Planned ||Quezon City
|-
| 12||SM Center Moonwalk Parañaque|| TBD || TBA || TBA || Planned || Moonwalk, Parañaque
|-
| 13||SM City Naga 2|| TBD || 41,000|| TBA || Planned ||  Naga, Camarines Sur
|-
| 14||SM Center North Davao|| TBD || TBA || TBA|| Planned ||  Davao City
|-
| 15||SM City San Jose, Nueva Ecija|| TBD || TBA || TBA|| Planned || San Jose, Nueva Ecija
|-
| 16||SM Center Camiling|| TBD || TBA || TBA|| Planned ||Camiling, Tarlac
|-
| 17||SM City Jaro|| || TBA || TBA|| Planned ||Jaro, Iloilo City
|-
| 18||SM Yulo Premier|| TBD || TBA || TBA || Planned || Santa Rosa, Laguna
|-
| 19||SM City Koronadal || TBD || TBA || TBA || Planned || Koronadal
|-
| 20||SM City Gerona|| TBD || TBA || TBA || Fenced || Gerona, Tarlac
|-
| 21|| SM City Pagsanjan || TBD || TBA || TBA || Planned || Pagsanjan, Laguna
|-
| 22|| SM City Tagbilaran  || TBA 
|| TBA || TBA || Planned || Hangos St. Brgy. Dao, Tagbilaran City, Bohol
|-
| 23|| SM City Iligan  || TBA
|| TBA || TBA || Planned || A. Bonifacio Ave. Brgy. Sto. Rosario, Iligan City, Lanao del Norte
|-
| 24|| SM City Bayombong || TBD || TBA || TBA || Planned || Bayombong Bypass Road, Brgy. Sta. Rosa & Brgy. Bonfal East, Bayombong, Nueva Vizcaya
|-
| 25 || SM City General Trias || 2025 || TBA || TBA || Planned|| RiverPark North General Trias, Cavite
|-
| 26 || SM Metro Mall Las Piñas || TBA || TBA || TBA || Planned|| Las Piñas City
|-
|}

China

 No.  Name  Opening Date Land area (m2) Floor area (m2) Location  Remarks  1  SM City Xiamen   104,000    Xiamen, Fujian  Initially opened as a department store. Later expanded in 2009 with the opening of the SM Lifestyle Center. 2  SM City Jinjiang    115,000    Quanzhou, Fujian  3  SM City Chengdu    48,000    Chengdu, Sichuan  4  SM City Suzhou    41,000    Chengdu, Sichuan   5  SM City Chongqing    –   Yubei District, Chongqing   6  SM City Zibo        Zibo, Shandong   7  SM City Tianjin       Tianjin  The second largest mall in the world based on GLA.

Future malls
This 1 SM Mall is under construction or still in proposal stage. Those in bold italics''''' are included in SM Prime's latest investor kit presentation

References

SM Supermalls
SM Supermalls
SM Supermalls